Buser (English: Hunt and Seized) is a criminal news program that aired on SCTV in Indonesia. This criminal news program was launched on January 7, 2002, and broadcasts criminal news that happens every day.

See also 

 Saksi Kunci
 Patroli

References 

Indonesian television news shows
Indonesian-language television shows
2002 Indonesian television series debuts
2000s Indonesian television series
SCTV (TV network) original programming